Apache Trail High School is a public charter high school in Apache Junction, Arizona. It is operated by The Leona Group, an operator of charter schools in Michigan, Ohio, Arizona, and Florida.

For athletics, it is a member of the Canyon Athletic Association (CAA).

Public high schools in Arizona
The Leona Group
Charter schools in Arizona
Schools in Pinal County, Arizona